Miloslav Gureň (born September 24, 1976) is a Czech former professional ice hockey defenseman who played 36 games for the Montreal Canadiens in the National Hockey League (NHL).

Playing career
Gureň played as a youth within professional club, PSG Berani Zlín of the Czech Extraliga. After his second professional season in the ELH in 1994–95, Gureň was selected by the Montreal Canadiens in the third round, 60th overall, of the 1995 NHL Entry Draft.

Having signed with the Canadiens, Gureň moved to North America prior to the 1996–97 season, playing with the Canadiens affiliate, the Fredericton Canadiens in the American Hockey League (AHL).

Gureň made his NHL debut with the Canadiens in the 1998–99 season, playing against the New York Rangers at the Molson Centre on October 10, 1998. He appeared in 12 games registering 1 assist. Unable to secure a regular spot on Montreal's blueline, Gureň played the majority of his tenure in the AHL.

After five seasons in North America, Gureň opted to return to Europe, signing with Czech club, HC Oceláři Třinec, for the 2001–02 season. He played 6 seasons in the Russian Superleague with CSKA Moscow and HC Sibir Novosibirsk before returning to the Czech Republic to play out the majority of his career.

Gureň ended his professional career following the 2014–15 season in the Italian Serie A, however opted to still continue playing through to 2019 at the Czech Regional level with local club, HC Uherské Brod.

Career statistics

Regular season and playoffs

International

Awards and honours

References

External links

1976 births
Living people
HC CSKA Moscow players
Czech ice hockey defencemen
Dragons de Rouen players
Ferencvárosi TC (ice hockey) players
Fredericton Canadiens players
HC Eppan Pirates players
HC Litvínov players
Montreal Canadiens draft picks
Montreal Canadiens players
HC Oceláři Třinec players
SG Pontebba players
Quebec Citadelles players
HC Sibir Novosibirsk players
HC Slovan Ústečtí Lvi players
PSG Berani Zlín players
People from Uherský Brod
Sportspeople from the Zlín Region
Czech expatriate ice hockey players in Canada
Czech expatriate ice hockey players in Russia
Czech expatriate sportspeople in Italy
Expatriate ice hockey players in Italy
Czech expatriate sportspeople in France
Expatriate ice hockey players in France